Boubacar Mansaly (born 4 February 1988) is a Senegalese professional footballer who plays as a midfielder for Abu Salem.

Career

Club
Mansaly was born in Guédiawaye. Between 2012 and 2015, he played for Romanian club Dinamo București. He scored his first goal for Dinamo in a 6–0 victory against U Cluj, on 23 August 2013.

On 25 December 2017, Mansaly left BB Erzurumspor.

On 28 June 2019, Atyrau announced the signing of Mansaly.

Honours
Dinamo București
 Supercupa României: 2012
Astra Giurgiu
 Liga I: 2015–16

References

External links
 
 
 
 Profile at anciensverts.com

1988 births
Living people
Association football midfielders
Senegalese footballers
JA Drancy players
Ligue 1 players
AS Saint-Étienne players
Liga I players
FC Dinamo București players
FC Astra Giurgiu players
Salam Zgharta FC players
FC Atyrau players
Senegalese expatriate footballers
Expatriate footballers in France
Senegalese expatriate sportspeople in France
Expatriate footballers in Romania
Senegalese expatriate sportspeople in Romania
Expatriate footballers in Turkey
Senegalese expatriate sportspeople in Turkey
Expatriate footballers in Lebanon
Senegalese expatriate sportspeople in Lebanon
Lebanese Premier League players